Walter John Pelham, 4th Earl of Chichester (22 September 1838 – 28 May 1902), styled as Lord Pelham from 1838 to 1886, was a British Liberal politician.

Pelham was the eldest son of Henry Pelham, 3rd Earl of Chichester, and his wife Lady Mary Brudenell, daughter of Robert Brudenell, 6th Earl of Cardigan. He was educated at Harrow and Trinity College, Cambridge, where he took his degree in 1859. In 1865 he was elected to the House of Commons for Lewes, a seat he held until 1874. He also served as Alderman for East Sussex, deputy lieutenant of Sussex and of Kent, and succeeding his father, as President of Brighton College.

Lord Chichester married, in 1861, Elizabeth Mary Bligh, only daughter of the Hon. Sir John Duncan Bligh. They had no children. He died at his residence Stanmer House on 28 May 1902, aged 63, and is buried in Stanmer churchyard. He was succeeded in his titles by his younger brother Reverend Francis Pelham. Lady Chichester died in December 1911, aged 74.

References

Kidd, Charles, Williamson, David (editors). Debrett's Peerage and Baronetage (1990 edition). New York: St Martin's Press, 1990.

External links 
 

1838 births
1902 deaths
People educated at Harrow School
Alumni of Trinity College, Cambridge
Earls of Chichester
Deputy Lieutenants of Sussex
Liberal Party (UK) MPs for English constituencies
UK MPs 1865–1868
UK MPs 1868–1874
UK MPs who inherited peerages
People associated with the University of Brighton
Walter